The 2003–04 ARFU Asian Rugby Series was the first edition of a tournament created by Asian Rugby Football Union for national teams. The formula was in two step. The 12 teams were divided in three pool of three, then, according to the results of the first round, in four pool in order to define the ranking.

Tournament

First round

Pool A 

 Ranking: 1. Japan 2. Hong Kong 3. Arabian Gulf 4. Sri Lanka

Pool B 

Ranking: 1. Chinese Taipei 2. Singapore 3. Malaysia 4. India

Pool C 

Ranking: 1. South Korea 2. China 3. Kazakhstan 4. Thailand

Final round

"Gold" (1st-3rd place) 

Ranking :
 1. 
 2. 
 3.   (relegated in division 2 of 2005 ARFU Asian Rugby Series)

Plate (4th-6th places) 

Ranking :
 4.   (Promoted in division 1 of 2005 ARFU Asian Rugby Series) 
 5. 
 6.   (relegated in division 3 of 2005 ARFU Asian Rugby Series)

Bowl (7th-9th place) 

Ranking :
 7. Arabian Gulf  (Promoted in division 2 of 2005 ARFU Asian Rugby Series) 
 8.   (in division 3 of 2005 ARFU Asian Rugby Series) 
 9.   (in division 3 of 2005 ARFU Asian Rugby Series)

Shield (10th-12th place) 

 10.   (in division 3 of 2005 ARFU Asian Rugby Series) 
 11.   (in division 3 of 2005 ARFU Asian Rugby Series) 
 12.   (in division 3 of 2005 ARFU Asian Rugby Series)

References

2003-04
2003 rugby union tournaments for national teams
2004 rugby union tournaments for national teams
2003 in Asian rugby union
2004 in Asian rugby union